The orange-cheeked honeyeater (Oreornis chrysogenys) is a species of bird in the family Meliphagidae. It is monotypic within the genus Oreornis.
It is endemic to West Papua, Indonesia.  Its natural habitat is subtropical or tropical moist montane forests.

References 

orange-cheeked honeyeater
Birds of Western New Guinea
orange-cheeked honeyeater
orange-cheeked honeyeater
Taxonomy articles created by Polbot